The Vojlovica Monastery is a Serb Orthodox monastery situated in the Banat region, in the northern Serbian province of Vojvodina. It is in the Pančevo municipality. It was founded during the time of Despot Stefan Lazarević (1374-1427).

Vojlovica Monastery was declared Monument of Culture of Exceptional Importance in 1990, and it is protected by Republic of Serbia.

See also
Monument of Culture of Exceptional Importance
Tourism in Serbia
List of Serb Orthodox monasteries

External links
More about the monastery

Serbian Orthodox monasteries in Vojvodina
Cultural Monuments of Exceptional Importance (Serbia)
Medieval Serbian Orthodox monasteries
Medieval sites in Serbia
14th-century Serbian Orthodox church buildings
14th-century establishments in Serbia
Banat
Pančevo